Mundeswari river is a small river in West Bengal which causes floods in Hooghly, Purba Medinipur and Howrah districts during the monsoons. It has been suggested that the banks of rivers such as Mundeswari should be protected with embankments to prevent floods.

History
The river is not mentioned in the 1910 district gazetteers, but it is mentioned in the 1994 Bardhaman District gazetteer.

During the devastating floods of 1914, the Damodar River split in two. One part joined the Mundeswari and the main channel of water of the Damodar now flows into the Mundeswari, turning it into a major river.

Geography
It originates as a canal from Ramchandrapur, a village in Madabdihi at the police station in Raina II block of the Bardhaman district. It flows past Kaiti Chakbhura and enters the Hooghly District. It ultimately flows into the Rupnarayan River.

References

External links
  Satellite view

See also

Rivers of West Bengal
Rivers of India